Inglisella is a genus of sea snails, marine gastropod mollusks in the family Cancellariidae, the nutmeg snails.

Species
Species within the genus Inglisella include:
 Inglisella etheridgei (Johnston, 1880)
 Inglisella marwicki (Dell, 1956) 
Species brought into synonymy
 Inglisella nympha Garrard, 1975: synonym of  Brocchinia exigua (E.A. Smith, 1891)
 Inglisella septentrionalis Finlay, 1930: synonym of Brocchinia septentrionalis (Finlay, 1930)

References

 Hemmen J. (2007). Recent Cancellariidae. Wiesbaden, 428pp

Cancellariidae
Taxa named by Harold John Finlay